Damian McDonald (12 May 1972 – 23 March 2007) was an Australian road bicycle racer, who was born in Wangaratta. He was an Australian Institute of Sport scholarship holder. McDonald died on 23 March 2007. He was one of three men killed in a collision and explosion in the Burnley Tunnel in Melbourne, Victoria.

Career
In 1990, McDonald won the Australian national road race title, beating Eddy Salas, who is also a successful road bicycle racer.

In 1992 he was a reserve for four-man pursuit team at the Barcelona Olympics, barely missing out on a medal when the team won silver, losing to Germany. In the same year McDonald was also inducted as a life member of the Blackburn Cycling Club. He won a gold medal at the 1994 Commonwealth Games as part of the road time trial team with Henk Vogels, Phil Anderson and Brett Dennis. He also won gold at the inaugural Malaysian Tour de Langkawi in 1996, and also represented Australia at the 1996 Summer Olympics in Atlanta.

Family
He was married to Bree McDonald, the manager of the Melbourne Vixens netball side. They have a son.

References

External links
Blackburn Cycling Club

1972 births
2007 deaths
Australian male cyclists
Cyclists at the 1996 Summer Olympics
Australian people of Irish descent
Olympic cyclists of Australia
Cyclists at the 1994 Commonwealth Games
Road incident deaths in Victoria (Australia)
Cyclists from Victoria (Australia)
Australian Institute of Sport cyclists
Commonwealth Games gold medallists for Australia
Commonwealth Games medallists in cycling
Medallists at the 1994 Commonwealth Games